Demoticoides is a genus of flies in the family Tachinidae.

Species
 Demoticoides pallidus Mesnil, 1953

References

Tachinidae
Invertebrates of China